A total lunar eclipse took place on Friday 21 January 2000, the first of two total lunar eclipses in 2000.

Visibility

Related lunar eclipses

Eclipses of 2000 
 A total lunar eclipse on January 21.
 A partial solar eclipse on February 5.
 A partial solar eclipse on July 1.
 A total lunar eclipse on July 16.
 A partial solar eclipse on July 31.
 A partial solar eclipse on December 25.

Lunar year series

Tritos series

Half-Saros cycle
A lunar eclipse will be preceded and followed by solar eclipses by 9 years and 5.5 days (a half saros). This lunar eclipse is related to two annular solar eclipses of Solar Saros 131.

See also 
List of lunar eclipses
List of 20th-century lunar eclipses

References

External links 
 Saros cycle 124
 

2000-01
2000 in science
January 2000 events